ArabTeX is a free software package providing support for the Arabic and Hebrew alphabets to TeX and LaTeX. Written by Klaus Lagally, it can take romanized ASCII or native script input to produce quality ligatures for Arabic, Persian, Urdu, Pashto, Sindhi, Western Punjabi (Lahnda), Maghribi, Uyghur, Kashmiri, Hebrew, Judeo-Arabic, Ladino and Yiddish. ArabTeX characters are placed within a TeX/LaTeX document using the command \RL{ ... } or the environment \begin{RLtext} ... \end{RLtext}. ArabTeX is released under the  LaTeX Project Public License v1+.

Example

\novocalize
\RL{al-salAm `alaykum}

 \documentclass[12pt]{article}
 \usepackage{arabtex}
 \begin{document}
 \setarab
 \fullvocalize
 \transtrue
 \arabtrue
 \begin{RLtext}
 bismi al-ll_ahi al-rra.hm_ani al-rra.hImi
 \end{RLtext}
 \end{document}

Common commands
 \setarab (set language specific rendering)
 \setfarsi (set language specific rendering)
 \setuighur (set language specific rendering)
 \set... (more language conventions, see the documentation)
 \novocalize (individual vowel marks can be displayed using "a, "i, "u) 
 \vocalize (individual vowel marks can be cancelled using "a, "i, "u)
 \fullvocalize (individual vowel marks can be cancelled using "a, "i, "u)
 \setcode{ } (switch input encodings)
 \settrans{ } (switch transliteration conventions)

Character table

Note that one can also overcome the problem with <yah> containing dots using the \yahnodots command.

See also
XePersian
FarsiTeX
XeTeX
ArabLuaTex
 List of TeX extensions

References

External links

ArabTeX package page
Documentation (pdf)
Download

Arabic-language computing
Free TeX software